Matthew Hodgson or Matt Hodgson may refer to:

 Matt Hodgson (born 1981), Australian professional rugby union player
 Matt Hodgson (basketball) (born 1991), Australian professional basketball player